Give, Get, Take and Have is a studio album by Curtis Mayfield, released in 1976 under Curtom Records. The track "P.S. I Love You" was later featured in the film Superbad and on its accompanied soundtrack.

Critical reception 

In Christgau's Record Guide: Rock Albums of the Seventies (1981), Robert Christgau said the album "meanders more than is conscionable", but was "most pleased to report that the opener, 'In My Arms Again,' is the first top-notch song [Mayfield]'s written for himself since 'Super Fly,' (somebody bad riffing on guitar—sounds like . . . Curtis Mayfield), and that the three that follow rock and roll."

Track listing
All tracks composed by Curtis Mayfield.

Personnel
Rich Tufo - arrangements
Fred Breitberg, Roger Anfinsen - engineer
Ed Thrasher - art direction, photography
Curtis Mayfield, Gary Thompson, Phil Upchurch - guitars
Floyd Morris, Rich Tufo - keyboards
Donnell Hagan - drums
Joseph "Lucky" Scott - bass
Henry Gibson - congas, percussion

References 

1976 albums
Curtis Mayfield albums
Albums produced by Curtis Mayfield
Curtom Records albums